Ketoisocaproic acid may refer to:

 α-Ketoisocaproic acid
 β-Ketoisocaproic acid